was a Japanese corporation that developed and published games for the Game Boy, Famicom, the Super Famicom, and the Sega Mega Drive during the 1980s and the 1990s. It was founded in 1986 and closed in early 1997.

Notable games

Nintendo

 Grand Master (Famicom)
 Top Rider (Famicom)
 Venus Senki (Famicom)
 Parallel World (Famicom)
 Nakajima Satoru: F-1 Hero (Famicom)
 Nakajima Satoru F-1 Hero 2 (Famicom)
 Satoru Nakajima F-1 Hero GB World Championship '91 (Game Boy)
 Super F1 Hero (Super Famicom)
 Nakajima Satoru F-1 Hero '94 (Super Famicom)
 Asahi Shinbun Rensai - Katou Ichi-Ni-San Shougi - Shingiryuu (Super Famicom)
 Shin Nippon Pro Wrestling: Chou Senshi in Tokyo Dome (Super Famicom) - 1993
 Shin Nippon Pro Wrestling '94: Battlefield in Tokyo Dome (Super Famicom)
 Shin Nippon Pro Wrestling '95: Tokyo Dome Battle 7 (Super Famicom)
 Shin Nippon Pro Wrestling: Toukon Sanjushi (Game Boy)
 Table Game Daisyugo!! Shogi Mahjong Hanafuda (Super Famicom)
 Nage Libre: Seijaku no Suishin (Super Famicom)
 Putty Moon (Super Famicom)
 Undercover Cops (Super Famicom)
 Stardust Suplex (Super Famicom)
 Yuujin: Janjyu Gakuen (Super Famicom)
 Yuujin: Janjyu Gakuen 2 (Super Famicom)

Sega
 F1 Grand Prix: Nakajima Satoru (Mega Drive)
 F1 Super License: Nakajima Satoru (Mega Drive)
 Ferrari Grand Prix Challenge (Mega Drive)

Sony
 Nage Libre-Rasen no Soukoku (PlayStation)

Handheld Games
Splatterhouse
Dragon Spirit
Family Stadium
Pac-Land
Galaga '91 (port of Galaga '88)

External links
 Giant Bomb - Varie
 Moby Games - Varie

Defunct video game companies of Japan
Video game publishers
Video game development companies
Video game companies established in 1986
Video game companies disestablished in 1997
Japanese companies established in 1986
Japanese companies disestablished in 1997